Motakondur is a village in Yadadri Bhuvanagiri district of the Indian state of Telangana. It is located in Motakondur mandal of Bhongir revenue division.

VILLAGES
The Mandal presently comprises the following villages:

Geography 

References 

Villages in Yadadri Bhuvanagiri district